The discography of English singer Dave Gahan consists of three studio albums, one live album, one compilation album, one extended play, 13 singles (including five as a featured artist), one video album and seven music videos. Gahan debuted in 1980 as lead singer of the electronic music band Depeche Mode. The group achieved worldwide success, producing 14 top-10 singles in the United Kingdom and selling over 100 million records worldwide.

Gahan released his solo debut album Paper Monsters in June 2003. The album, which was composed with Gahan's close friend Knox Chandler, peaked at number 36 on the UK Albums Chart, as well as number five in Germany and Sweden. The album spawned three singles, all of which reached the top 40 of the UK Singles Chart. Live Monsters, a live video album, and its companion album Soundtrack to Live Monsters were released the following year. His second studio album, Hourglass, was released in October 2007, reaching number 50 in the United Kingdom and number two in Germany. The album's lead single, "Kingdom", reached number one on the Billboard Hot Dance Club Play chart in the United States.

Albums

Studio albums

Live albums

Compilation albums

Extended plays
as lead artist

as featured artist

Singles

As lead artist

As featured artist

Guest appearances

Videography

Video albums

Music videos

See also
 Depeche Mode discography

Notes

References

External links
 
 
 
 

Alternative rock discographies
Discographies of British artists
Electronic music discographies
Pop music discographies